Peter Taltavull (1825 – April 8, 1881) played a minor role in the events surrounding the assassination of Abraham Lincoln.  John Wilkes Booth stopped at Taltavull's Star Saloon just before going to Ford's Theatre next door and assassinating President Abraham Lincoln.

Biography
Taltavull owned the Star Saloon located in Washington, D.C., next door to Ford's Theatre. Lincoln's assassin, John Wilkes Booth, stopped at Taltavull's saloon just before entering the theater and shooting the President.  The Star Saloon was briefly considered as a place to bring the wounded Lincoln before the  decision was made to take him to William Petersen's boarding house.

On May 15, 1865, Taltavull testified for the prosecution during the conspiracy trial, and stated that he had been acquainted with the defendant, David Herold, as far back as Herold's boyhood.  Taltavull also testified that he had served Booth a drink of whiskey and water shortly before the assassination.

For over twenty-five years Taltavull had been a French horn player with the Marine Band.

Taltavull died on April 8, 1881, and is buried at Congressional Cemetery.

See also

Abraham Lincoln assassination

References
Kauffman, Michael W. American Brutus: John Wilkes Booth and the Lincoln Conspiracies. Random House, 2004. 
Kunhardt, Dorothy Meserve, and Kunhardt Jr., Phillip B. Twenty Days. Castle Books, 1965.

External links
Congressional Cemetery
Taltavull's testimony (and that of others).

1826 births
1881 deaths
Drinking establishment owners
People of Washington, D.C., in the American Civil War
Burials at the Congressional Cemetery
American horn players
19th-century American musicians
People associated with the assassination of Abraham Lincoln